Coelotrochus carinatus is a species of sea snail, a marine gastropod mollusk in the family Trochidae, the top snails.

Description
The height of the shell attains 3.8 mm, its diameter 4.3 mm.

Distribution
This marine species is endemic to New Zealand and occurs off Three Kings Islands.

References

  Marshall B.A. 1998. A review of the Recent Trochini of New Zealand (Mollusca: Gastropoda: Trochidae). Molluscan Research 19(1): 73–106
 Spencer, H.G.; Marshall, B.A.; Maxwell, P.A.; Grant-Mackie, J.A.; Stilwell, J.D.; Willan, R.C.; Campbell, H.J.; Crampton, J.S.; Henderson, R.A.; Bradshaw, M.A.; Waterhouse, J.B.; Pojeta, J. Jr (2009). Phylum Mollusca: chitons, clams, tusk shells, snails, squids, and kin, in: Gordon, D.P. (Ed.) (2009). New Zealand inventory of biodiversity: 1. Kingdom Animalia: Radiata, Lophotrochozoa, Deuterostomia. pp. 161–254

carinatus